Jiggetts may refer to:
Jiggetts housing assistance program or Family Eviction Prevention  Supplement
Jiggetts (New York legal case)

People with the surname
Dan Jiggetts, American retired football player